This Film's Crap Let's Slash the Seats is the debut album by David Holmes, originally released in 1995. It was reissued in the US with a bonus CD of remixes and B-sides in 1998. "No Man's Land", "Minus 61 in Detroit" and "Gone" were released as singles.

Track listing 
"No Man's Land" – 12:45
"Slash the Seats" – 7:17
"Shake Ya Brain" – 9:14
"Got Fucked Up Along the Way" – 8:16
"Gone" (featuring Sarah Cracknell) – 8:09
"The Atom and You" – 6:40
"Minus 61 in Detroit" – 9:21
"Inspired by Leyburn" – 8:02
"Coming Home to the Sun" – 7:44

Bonus disc
"Gone (First Night Without Charge)" (featuring Sarah Cracknell) (remix by Two Lone Swordsmen) – 9:59
"Gone (The Kruder & Dorfmeister Session TM)" (featuring Sarah Cracknell) (remix by Kruder & Dorfmeister) – 7:51
"Mosh It" – 6:13
"Slash The Seats (Slash The Beats)" (B-side to "No Man's Land") – 6:40
"The Connecting Flight Syndrome" (B-side "Minus 61 in Detroit") – 7:40
"Smoked Oak" (B-side to "No Man's Land") – 7:33
"Gone (Alter Ego Decoding Gone Part 2)" (featuring Sarah Cracknell) (remix by Alter Ego) – 5:42
"Gone (Second Night Without Charge)" (featuring Sarah Cracknell) (remix by Two Lone Swordsmen) – 8:37

References

1995 debut albums
David Holmes (musician) albums
Go! Discs albums